The 2015 Asian Beach Volleyball Championship was a beach volleyball event, that was held from October 1 to 4, 2015 in Hong Kong, China. The competition included only women's event.

Medal summary

Participating nations 

 (2)
 (2)
 (2)
 (2)
 (3)
 (2)
 (2)
 (2)
 (2)
 (1)
 (2)
 (1)
 (1)

Tournament

Preliminary round

Pool A 

|}

Pool B 

|}

Pool C 

|}

Pool D 

|}

Pool E 

|}

Pool F 

|}

Pool G 

|}

Pool H 

|}

Knockout round

References 

Results

External links
Asian Volleyball Confederation

Asian Championships
Beach volleyball
Beach volleyball
Asian Beach Volleyball Championship